The Chillagoe fine-lined slider (Lerista parameles) is a species of skink found in Queensland in Australia.

References

Lerista
Taxa named by Andrew P. Amey
Reptiles described in 2019
Taxa named by Patrick J. Couper
Taxa named by Jessica Worthington Wilmer